The Homecoming is a 1973 British-American drama film directed by Peter Hall based on the play of the same name by Harold Pinter. The film was produced by Ely Landau for the American Film Theatre, which presented thirteen film adaptations of plays in the United States from 1973 to 1975. The film was screened at the 1974 Cannes Film Festival, but was not entered into the main competition.

Plot
Teddy brings his wife home to meet his estranged family.

Cast
All cast members from the play's first performance in 1965 reprise their roles here, with the exception of Cyril Cusack and Michael Jayston who replace John Normington and Michael Bryant respectively.
Paul Rogers as Max, father of Lenny, Teddy, and Joey
Ian Holm as Lenny
Cyril Cusack as Sam, brother of Max
Terence Rigby as Joey
Michael Jayston as Teddy
Vivien Merchant as Ruth

Reception
On Rotten Tomatoes, the film has a score of 100% based on 5 reviews, with an average rating of 8.7/10.

References

External links

1973 drama films
1973 films
American films based on plays
American independent films
Films with screenplays by Harold Pinter
British independent films
American drama films
British drama films
Films produced by Ely Landau
1973 independent films
Films directed by Peter Hall
1970s English-language films
1970s American films
1970s British films